Wrong Turn 2: Dead End is a 2007 American slasher film directed by Joe Lynch and starring Erica Leerhsen, Henry Rollins and Texas Battle. It is a sequel to Wrong Turn (2003) and the second installment in the Wrong Turn film series. The film received a positive response from critics and remains the best-reviewed film in the franchise. It grossed $9.2 million in home video sales.

It is followed by Wrong Turn 3: Left for Dead (2009).

Plot
Reality show contestant Kimberly is driving through the West Virginia backcountry searching for the location of her next project. While driving, she accidentally hits a teenager. She stops to help him, but he turns out to be an inbred cannibal, who bites her lips off. She attempts to escape but runs into Three Finger, who splits her in half with his axe before he and the cannibal Brother drag her body halves away.

Former U.S. Marine Colonel Dale Murphy is hosting a survival reality game show, The Apocalypse: Ultimate Survivalist, in production at the West Virginia forest. With Kimberly's unknown absence, the show's producer Mara reluctantly takes her place to participate in the show with the other contestants: lesbian Iraq veteran Amber, lingerie model Elena, former football player Jake, skateboarder Jonesy, and graphic artist Nina. As the game starts, Three Finger and another mutant cannibal Pa murder the television crew and abduct Dale. Mara finishes a task and then enters a cabin to find a telephone as Nina follows her. While looking around the cabin, they hear the occupants return and hide in a bedroom. Mara and Nina witness a female cannibal, Ma, giving birth to a deformed baby. Her daughter Sister spots them in the bedroom, forcing the two to escape through the toilet pit. They run into the woods, but Mara is hit in the head with a hatchet thrown by Pa. Nina searches for the others as the cannibals collect Mara's corpse. At the lake, cinematographer M and Elena have sex before the former leaves and Elena stays to tan in her underwear. When she hears a noise, she starts to get dressed as Sister emerges and slashes her to death with a machete while Pa and Ma hijack the RV and capture M.

Dale manages to escape and battles Three Finger, ending the fight after Dale shoots the cannibal into the lake with a shotgun. He then enters the mutant family's cabin and finds the old gas station attendant, who reveals how the cannibals' mutations were caused by inbreeding and effluent dumped in the river from an abandoned paper mill 30 years ago. The man, who is revealed to be the grandfather of Three Finger and the two other inbred mountain men who have been killed, attacks Dale to avenge their deaths. After a brief skirmish, Dale kills the old man by blowing him up with a stick of dynamite. Meanwhile, the three other contestants are eating some meat found by Amber and Jonesy when Nina returns to explain her story. They then realize that they have been eating Kimberly's leg and attempt to escape but Nina separates from the group while they're fighting Brother and Sister. Jake rescues Nina from a pit and they jump into the river to escape Sister.

After Amber and Jonesy are killed while searching for help, Nina and Jake enter the mill and find a garage with vehicles stolen from prior victims. They find the RV, and Jake enters it only to witness M being decapitated by Ma on a live feed monitor inside. Nina and Jake attempt to leave, but the cannibals capture them. The next day, while the two are held hostage, Dale sneaks into the compound to distract the cannibal family who were eating their dinner and manages to kill Brother and Sister with a dynamite stick attached to an arrow. He frees Nina and Jake, but is killed by Ma and Pa, who are incensed by the deaths of their children. Nina successfully escapes, but Jake wanders into a room fitted with a tree debarker, where he is attacked by Ma and Pa. Nina returns to the mill and kills Ma and Pa with the debarker. Nina and Jake find Kimberly's abandoned sportscar and drive away.

Meanwhile, Three Finger has survived and is seen raising the mutant family's baby, feeding it with a bottle of effluent and a human finger.

Cast

 Erica Leerhsen as Nina Papas
 Henry Rollins as Dale Murphy
 Texas Battle as Jake Washington
 Aleksa Palladino as Mara Stone
 Daniella Alonso as Amber Williams
 Steve Braun as Matt "Jonesy" Jones
 Matthew Currie Holmes as Michael "M" Epstein 
 Crystal Lowe as Elena Garcia
 Kimberly Caldwell as Kimberly
 Wayne Robson as Old Timer
 Ken Kirzinger as Pa
 Ashlea Earl as Ma
 Clint Carleton as Brother
 Rorelee Tio as Sister
 Jeff Scrutton as Three Finger
 Cedric De Souza as Neil
 John Stewart as Wojo
 Bro Gilbert as Chris
 Patton Oswalt as Tommy (voice)

Soundtrack

The soundtrack was released on September 18, 2007, by La-La Land Records. It is composed by Bear McCreary.

Track listing
"Main Title" (3:39)
"Ultimate Survivalist Theme Song" (3:20) by Captain Ahab
"Dale for Dinner" (2:33)
"Birth of Baby Splooge" (3:04)
"Nina's Theme" (2:43)
"Mutant Cannibal Incest" (3:01)
"Into the Mill" (2:49)
"Arrow Through Two Heads" (3:18)
"Dale Vigilante" (3:19)
"Hunting Dale" (3:40)
"Rescuing Nina" (3:04)
"Dale to the Rescue" (3:18)
"The Meat Grinder" (2:15)
"Baby Splooge Lives" (2:36)
"End Credits (Theme from Wrong Turn 2)" (3:39)
"Under Your Bones" (5:25) by Captain Ahab featuring Ivor

Release
Wrong Turn 2: Dead End was screened both at the London FrightFest Film Festival on August 25 in the United Kingdom and Austin's Fantastic Fest on September 21, 2007, in the United States, respectively.

The film was released on DVD on October 9, 2007, in an unrated version with extras include commentary by director Joe Lynch and actors Erica Leerhsen and Henry Rollins, a second commentary by writers Turi Meyer and Al Septien, a featurette on the making of the film and the trailer. The film later released on Blu-ray on September 15, 2009. It grossed $9.2 million in home video sales in the US.

Reception
Rotten Tomatoes, a review aggregator, reports that it received positive reviews from 70% of 10 critics.

Steve Barton of Dread Central gave the film 4 out of 5 stars, stating that the film "is a hot ticket for some gore-soaked backwoods mayhem that gets even better with repeated viewings and lots of booze."  Brian Collins of Bloody Disgusting stated that "what could have been a cheap and lazy cash-in turned out to be one of the year's better genre offerings".  David Johnson of DVD Verdict said the film is "a derivative and stupid outing" but very entertaining.  David Walker of DVD Talk rated the film 3.5/5 stars and called it "a consistently entertaining film" that effectively parodies and homages genre films that have come before it. Fangoria'''s Michael Gingold wrote that Lynch directed the film "with all the energy of a longtime hardcore horror fan getting the chance to let it all hang out in his debut feature".
David Feraci from the horror-themed website CHUD believed the film has "its heart in the right place", and FEARnet's Scott Weinberg compared it The Texas Chainsaw Massacre 2, calling it a "fast-paced and completely unapologetic love-letter to the old-school '80s splatter sequels". Anton Bitel, writing for Eye for Film'', named it a "superior, self-parodic sequel".

At the Gérardmer Film Festival, the film won the Best Direct-to-Video Film Award.

References

External links
 
 

2
2007 films
2007 directorial debut films
2007 horror films
2007 LGBT-related films
2000s American films
2000s English-language films
2000s slasher films
American LGBT-related films
American sequel films
American slasher films
American splatter films
Incest in film
Lesbian-related films
LGBT-related horror films
Reality television series parodies
Direct-to-video sequel films
Films about cannibalism
Films set in West Virginia
Films shot in Vancouver
Films directed by Joe Lynch
Films scored by Bear McCreary
Constantin Film films
Summit Entertainment films
20th Century Fox direct-to-video films